The Ni'matnāmah Naṣir al-Dīn Shāhī (c. 1500) is a medieval Indian cookbook, written in Persian language using Naskh script, of delicacies and recipes, and some accompanying paintings illustrating the preparation of the recipes. It was started for Ghiyath Shah (r. 1469–1500), the ruler of the Malwa Sultanate in central India. After he was forced to abdicate, it was completed for his son 'Abd al-Muzaffar Nasir Shah. (r. 1500–10).

Some of the illustrations have women painted wearing men's various types of Persian and Indian garments and turbans, including a specific style of turban which is also featured in Turkman style paintings of 1470s. The style of the surrounding landscape are influenced by the Turkmen style of the last third of the 15th century.

The Manuscript is in the British Library, London. It was first written about by Robert Skelton, museum curator and scholar of Indian art (1929–2022), in 1959.

At least two artists collaborated in illustrating the Ni'mat nāmā. These artists emphasized different features of Turkmen style of Shirazi painting that was contemporary at that time. The illustrations also introduced representations of indigenous costumes of Malwa and Indian facial types. Such stylistic innovations are also seen in paintings from the Cāurāpāncāsika (Chaurapanchasika) series. This suggests that reciprocal influences were at work between centers of painting of Muslim and Hindu patronage.

References

Further reading 
 

16th-century Indian books
Cookbooks of the medieval Islamic world
Persian-language books
Persian art
History of Malwa